Mount Saint Mary's University, Los Angeles (known as Mount St. Mary's College until January 2015) is a private, Catholic university primarily for women, in Los Angeles, California. Women make up ninety percent of the student body.

History

Chalon Campus

The university first held its classes at St. Mary's Academy, then located at West Slauson Avenue and Crenshaw Boulevard. In 1928, the Sisters purchased  of land along the foothills of the Santa Monica Mountains from the Rodeo Land and Water Company for $162,000. In 1947, an additional  was acquired to complete what is today the university's Chalon campus. The campus contains a blend of architecture familiar to Los Angeles, largely in the tradition of the Spanish Colonial Revival and Mission Revival styles.

Being the university's first campus, Chalon has been home to a number of important events in the history of the university. In 1929, the university's first graduation was held on the Chalon campus. In 1952, the university granted its first baccalaureate degrees in nursing, also the first in Southern California. In 1955, the university began offering graduate degree programs.

Today, Chalon is home to the university's traditional baccalaureate programs, offering more than 35 academic majors and minors. The most popular majors are: nursing, pre-nursing, psychology, biology, sociology, and business.

The Geena Davis Institute on Gender in Media is located at the university.

Doheny Campus

The university grew to two campuses in 1962 when it was given , holding two city blocks of Queen Anne style and Victorian mansions, in Los Angeles next to the University of Southern California. The tranquil property was formerly owned by Edward L. Doheny and his wife, the Countess Estelle Doheny, who made their fortune in oil. The Chester Place residences were built at the turn of the century by Judge Charles Silent. The university named the campus after the Countess Doheny and her husband. Due to the Countess' desire for privacy, the Dohenys purchased all the adjacent houses and made it into a private street. The University Park campus is located in one of the oldest neighborhoods of the city.

The Doheny campus first played host to the university's Associate in Arts program when it opened in 1962. Forty years later, in 2002, the university began its first doctoral degree, in physical therapy, which joined the other graduate programs now offered at the Doheny campus.

In 1992, the university launched its Weekend and Evening College program at the Chalon campus, which primarily focuses on providing working professionals the opportunity to complete their undergraduate degrees within four years by attending classes scheduled on weekends. The Weekend and Evening College program moved to the Doheny campus in 2006, joining a number of courses for the associate and graduate programs offered at Doheny on weekday evenings and on weekends, furthering the idea of accessibility introduced by Weekend and Evening College.

Doheny is home to the university's associate, daytime and evening graduate programs, Weekend and Evening College (undergraduate and graduate), and educational credential programs.

Demographics
The student body is 90 percent female and 10 percent male.

In the media

Due to its isolated location and beautiful vistas and architecture, a number of movies and television shows have filmed on either the Doheny or Chalon campus of the university. The list includes, but is not limited to:

References

External links
Official website

 
Congregation of the Sisters of Saint Joseph
Women's universities and colleges in the United States
Universities and colleges in Los Angeles
Association of Catholic Colleges and Universities
Schools accredited by the Western Association of Schools and Colleges
Educational institutions established in 1925
Catholic universities and colleges in California
Brentwood, Los Angeles
University Park, Los Angeles
1925 establishments in California
Liberal arts colleges in California
Women in California